Boston is a locality on the Eyre Peninsula of South Australia, situated in the District Council of Lower Eyre Peninsula. It consists of a coastal section immediately north of Port Lincoln and a broader area inland; while it is residential along the coast, much of the locality remains semi-rural. The name and boundaries were formalised in October 2003 for the long established local name. On 15 October 2009, sections of Boston were severed and added to North Shields and the new locality of Tiatukia, while a portion of adjacent Hawson was added to Boston.

The Lincoln Highway runs along the coast through Boston. The Port Lincoln Golf Course is located in its southwestern corner.

The historic Boston House, located on Lincoln Highway, is listed on the South Australian Heritage Register. The National Trust of South Australia-owned Brinkworth Reserve, which was the subject of a prominent public campaign over a cancelled sale attempt in 2014–15, is also located at Boston.

References

Towns in South Australia
Eyre Peninsula